The Artemis Stakes (Japanese アルテミスステークス) is a Grade 3 horse race for two-year-old Thoroughbred fillies run in October over a distance of 1600 metres at Tokyo Racecourse.

The race was first run in 2012 and has held Grade 3 status since 2014.

Winners since 2012

See also
 Horse racing in Japan
 List of Japanese flat horse races

References

Turf races in Japan